KIHP (1310 AM) is a Catholic radio station licensed to Mesa, Arizona, serving the Phoenix metropolitan area. It is owned by Relevant Radio, Inc.

History
The station signed on in 1946 as KTYL on 1490 kHz, owned by the Harkins Theater group. It was the second station in Mesa, signing on 3 days after KARV (1400 AM). Both stations ran 250 watts full-time with non-directional antennas — the maximum power allowed for Class IV (now Class C) stations at the time. Two years later, KTYL bought and shut down KARV; its frequency was reactivated in Phoenix in 1950 as KONI (now KSUN).

Harkins also put Arizona's first FM station (KTYL-FM 104.7, now KZZP) on the air in 1950; this was followed by Phoenix's second TV station (KTYL-TV channel 12, now KPNX) on the air. As with the AM station, both stations were originally located in (and are still licensed to) Mesa.

KTYL moved to 1310 in the early 1950s, and eventually increased its power to 5,000 watts day and 500 watts night. It became KBUZ, a beautiful music station, in February 1958, with the slogan 'Drive with care, and KBUZ, everywhere'. At that time, it moved to Thomas Mall on the east side of Phoenix. The format was simulcast on 104.7 FM, by now KBUZ-FM.

On January 1, 1977, the station became KQXE, with a very successful personality oriented oldies format For three years it dominated Eastern Phoenix radio, going up against market leader KOY. Management assembled a group of talents from the Phoenix radio region and added experienced, market leading individuals such as Phil Barry (Detroit) and Phil Gardner (Cleveland) https://archive.org/details/KQXEPhoenixPhilGardiner1980. After owners Southwestern Media sold the station to Western Cities Broadcasting, KQXE transitioned to a pop format under the calls KZZP, which is shared with sister FM station 104.7.

After a precisely 10-year-long simulcast, 1310 AM split from the simulcast of KZZP-FM on February 19, 1990 and became KXAM. Initially an adult standards station, KXAM later became an independent talk station, airing syndicated shows including Laura Ingraham, Dave Ramsey and Matt Gerson. Gerson was part of the family that controlled KXAM's owner, Embree Broadcasting, and hosted a political talk show until March 2009. Soon afterward, Embree announced that KXAM would cease operations. Two of the station's local programs, Culinary Confessions (a food show) and The Bandwagon (a sports show) moved to KAZG soon after the announcement. Although KXAM employees had offered to buy the station, the Gerson family turned their offers down, insisting at that time on returning the license to the Federal Communications Commission. The station went silent April 16, 2009.

On June 1, 2009, the Gerson family backed off from its plans to surrender the KXAM license and sold it to IHR Educational Broadcasting for $1 million. It returned to the air as KIHP, with Catholic programming from Immaculate Heart Radio, on December 17. The station assumed the Relevant Radio branding when IHR Educational Broadcasting and Starboard Media Foundation consummated their merger on June 30, 2017.

Translators

References

External links

 
 
 FCC History Cards for KIHP

Catholic radio stations
Radio stations established in 1946
1946 establishments in Arizona
Relevant Radio stations
IHP